Bill Baldridge is a former American football player and coach. He served as the head football coach at Georgetown College in Georgetown, Kentucky in 1980 and at Morehead State University in Morehead, Kentucky from 1984 to 1989, compiling a career college football coaching record of 24–50. As an assistant at Morehead State in 1975, he coached Phil Simms, future quarterback in the National Football League (NFL).

Head coaching record

College

References

Year of birth missing (living people)
1940s births
Living people
American football ends
Cincinnati Bearcats football coaches
Georgetown Tigers football coaches
Kansas Jayhawks football coaches
Morehead State Eagles football coaches
Morehead State Eagles football players
Murray State Racers football  coaches
High school football coaches in Kentucky